Court-Saint-Étienne is a municipality of Wallonia located in the Belgian province of Walloon Brabant. On 1 January 2006 Court-Saint-Étienne had a total population of 9,408.

The municipality includes the following districts: Wisterzée, Sart-Messire-Guillaume, La Roche, Mérivaux, Suzeril, Faux, Limauges, Beaurieux, Franquenies, Le Chenoy, and Tangissart.

Sports

Court-Saint-Étienne is home to Royal Excelsior Stéphanois football club.

References

External links
 

 
Municipalities of Walloon Brabant